Xactly Corporation is a pure-play, SaaS company that provides cloud-based enterprise software and services. They offer tools to allow for sales performance management, sales effectiveness, sales compensation, and employee engagement.

Xactly Corporation is headquartered in San Jose, California.

The company raised $116 million in funding since its inception in 2005. Its investors include Rembrandt Venture Partners, Alloy Ventures, Key Venture Partners, Bay Partners, Outlook Ventures, Illuminate Ventures, Silicon Valley Bank, Wellington Financial, and Salesforce.com.

Company history
Xactly Corp was created on March 1, 2005 by Founder and CEO Christopher W. Cabrera and Co-Founder and Managing Director Satish K. Palvai. The company is headquartered in San Jose, California.

Xactly Corp acquired Centive, an automated incentive compensation management technology solutions company, in 2009.

On July 31, 2017, the company was taken private by Vista Equity Partners and was delisted from the New York Stock Exchange.

References

Software companies based in the San Francisco Bay Area
Companies based in San Jose, California
Business software companies
Cloud computing providers
Companies formerly listed on the New York Stock Exchange
2015 initial public offerings
Private equity portfolio companies
American companies established in 2005
Software companies established in 2005
2017 mergers and acquisitions
Software companies of the United States